Edy Rafael Vásquez Andrade (October 31, 1983 – May 12, 2007) was a Honduran football midfielder, who played for F.C. Motagua.

Club career
Vasquez made his debut for Motagua on April 3, 2004, a 3–2 loss  against Real España in the Estadio Olímpico Metropolitano in San Pedro Sula and played 63 matches wearing Motagua's blue shirt and scored 7 times. His scored his first goal on March 13, 2005, in a 2–1 win against Victoria in Tegucigalpa when he scored in the final minute.

His last game was on April 29, 2007 with a 1–0 win over Marathon and his last goal was against Hispano on October 5, 2006, in Tegucigalpa.

He suffered from a tibia and fibula fracture preventing him playing for most of the 2006–07 season.

International career
Vásquez made his debut for Honduras in an August 2006 friendly match against Venezuela and has earned a total of 3 caps, scoring no goals.

His final international was an October 2006 friendly match against Guatemala.

Personal life and death
Vásquez was a son of Sandra Andrade and he had a daughter with his fiancée Pamela Ocampo: Yeimi Alexandra.

He died in the Hospital Escuela in the morning of May 12, 2007, when the car which was carrying him crashed into a wall at the Fuerzas Armadas Boulevard in Colonia Las Brisas, Tegucigalpa. The accident left the driver and another passenger injured. Police stated all three were infused by alcohol.

Due to his death, the club team Motagua has retired his jersey number 16 in respect of his loyalty to the team.

References

External links

1983 births
2007 deaths
Sportspeople from Tegucigalpa
Association football midfielders
Honduran footballers
Honduras international footballers
F.C. Motagua players
Liga Nacional de Fútbol Profesional de Honduras players
Road incident deaths in Honduras